The second annual AVMA's aired live in the Acer Arena in Sydney on 12 April 2006 on the Foxtel, Austar and Optus platforms and was hosted by Ashlee Simpson.
The 2006 show left out the VH1 Music First Award (which was awarded to Cher at the 2005 show), Best Dressed Video and Sexiest Video.

Performers
 Ashlee Simpson — "Boyfriend"/"L.O.V.E"
 Bernard Fanning — "Wish You Well"
 End of Fashion — "O Yeah"
 James Blunt — "You're Beautiful"
 Lee Harding — "Anything for You"
 Rogue Traders — "Watching You"
 Savage feat. Scribe — "Swing"/"Moonshine"/"They Don't Know"
 Shannon Noll — "Shine"
 The Darkness — "One Way Ticket"/"I Believe in a Thing Called Love"
 The Veronicas — "When It All Falls Apart"

Nominees and winners
The winners are in bold.

Video of the Year
 Gorillaz — "Feel Good Inc."
 Green Day — "Wake Me Up When September Ends"
 Madonna — "Hung Up"
 The Darkness — "One Way Ticket"
 The Veronicas — "4ever"

Song of the Year
 Ben Lee — "Catch My Disease"
 Bernard Fanning — "Wish You Well"
 James Blunt — "You're Beautiful"
 Kanye West — "Gold Digger"
 Madonna — "Hung Up"

Album of the Year
 Ben Lee — Awake Is the New Sleep
 Bernard Fanning — Tea & Sympathy
 Coldplay — X&Y
 Foo Fighters — In Your Honor
 Madonna — Confessions on a Dance Floor

Best Male Artist
 Bernard Fanning — "Wish You Well"
 James Blunt — "You're Beautiful"
 Kanye West — "Gold Digger"
 Robbie Williams — "Trippin'"
 Shannon Noll — "Shine"

Best Female Artist
 Ashlee Simpson — "Boyfriend"
 Kelly Clarkson — "Because of You"
 Madonna — "Hung Up"
 Mariah Carey — "Shake It Off"
 Missy Higgins — "The Special Two"

Best Group
 Foo Fighters — "Best of You"
 Gorillaz — "Feel Good Inc."
 Green Day — "Wake Me Up When September Ends"
 U2 — "All Because of You"
 Wolfmother — "Mind's Eye"

Spankin' New Aussie Artist
 End of Fashion — "O Yeah"
 Kisschasy — "Do-Do's & Whoa-Oh's"
 Rogue Traders — "Voodoo Child"
 The Veronicas — "4ever"
 Wolfmother — "Mind's Eye"

Best Rock Video
 Foo Fighters — "Best of You"
 Green Day — "Wake Me Up When September Ends"
 Pete Murray — "Class A"
 The Darkness — "One Way Ticket"
 Wolfmother — "Mind's Eye"

Best Pop Video
 Anthony Callea — "The Prayer"
 Ashlee Simpson — "Boyfriend"
 Kelly Clarkson — "Because of You"
 Robbie Williams — "Trippin'"
 The Veronicas — "4ever"

Best Dance Video
 BodyRockers — "I Like The Way (You Move)"
 Madonna — "Hung Up"
 Mylo — "Drop the Pressure"
 Rihanna — "Pon de Replay"
 Rogue Traders — "Voodoo Child"

Best R&B Video
 Jade MacRae — "So Hot Right Now"
 Chris Brown feat.  Juelz Santana — "Run It!"
 Mariah Carey — "Shake It Off"
 Mario — "Let Me Love You"
 Pussycat Dolls — "Don't Cha"

Best Hip Hop Video
 50 Cent — "Candy Shop"
 The Black Eyed Peas — "Don't Phunk with My Heart"
 Kanye West feat. Jamie Foxx — "Gold Digger"
 Savage feat. Akon — "Moonshine"
 Snoop Dogg feat. Pharrell — "Drop It Like It's Hot"

Viewers Choice
 Anthony Callea — "The Prayer"
 The Veronicas — "4ever"

Free Your Mind Award
 Peter Garrett

See also
 MTV Australia
 MTV Australia Video Music Awards

External links
 MTV AVMA's Official Site
 MTV Australia
 MTV Asia article
 SMH article

MTV Australia Awards
2006 music awards
2006 in Australian music
2000s in Sydney